Austrocidaria arenosa is a species of moth in the family Geometridae. It is endemic to New Zealand. This moth is classified as "At Risk, Declining" by the Department of Conservation.

Taxonomy 
This species was first described by George Howes in 1911 using specimens collected at Mr O'Connors house at Titahi Bay, Porirua and given the name Eucymatoge arenosus. George Vernon Hudson discussed and illustrated this species in his 1928 publication. Hudson changed its epithet to arenosa. In 1988 John S. Dugdale discussed this change and assigned the species to a new genus Austrocidaria. The holotype specimen is held at the Natural History Museum, London.

Description 
Howes described the adult moths of the species as follows:

Distribution 
This species is endemic to New Zealand. As well as the type locality of Titahi Bay, A. arenosa has also been recorded as occurring at Moeraki near Oamaru, at Paekakariki, and near Cass.

Biology and life cycle 
This species is attracted to blossoms, sugar and light.  Adult moths are on the wing between November and March.

Conservation status 
This moth is classified under the New Zealand Threat Classification system as being "At Risk, Declining".

References

Xanthorhoini
Moths of New Zealand
Moths described in 1911
Endemic fauna of New Zealand
Endangered biota of New Zealand
Taxa named by George Howes (entomologist)
Endemic moths of New Zealand